Murum is a town with a municipal council in Osmanabad district in the Indian state of Maharashtra.

Geography
It has an elevation of on average of 548 metres (1797 feet).

Demographics
In the 2011 census, Murum had a population of 18,472. Marathi is the official language but Kannada is most widely spoken language of the town. Urdu is also spoken by some.

References

Cities and towns in Osmanabad district